Thomas Griffith Haight Sr. (August 4, 1879 – January 26, 1942) was a United States circuit judge of the United States Court of Appeals for the Third Circuit and previously was a United States district judge of the United States District Court for the District of New Jersey.

Early life
Born on August 4, 1879, in Freehold Borough, New Jersey, Haight attended Princeton University and then received a Bachelor of Laws in 1900 from New York Law School.

Career

Early career
He entered private practice in Jersey City, New Jersey from 1901 to 1913. He was city attorney for Jersey City from 1911 to 1913. He was corporation counsel for Hudson County, New Jersey from 1913 to 1914.

Federal judicial service
Haight was nominated by President Woodrow Wilson on February 3, 1914, to a seat on the United States District Court for the District of New Jersey vacated by Judge Joseph Cross. He was confirmed by the United States Senate on February 18, 1914, and received his commission the same day. His service terminated on April 1, 1919, due to his elevation to the Third Circuit.

Haight received a recess appointment from President Wilson on April 1, 1919, to a seat on the United States Court of Appeals for the Third Circuit vacated by Judge John Bayard McPherson. He was nominated to the same position by President Wilson on May 23, 1919. He was confirmed by the Senate on June 24, 1919, and received his commission the same day. His service terminated on May 31, 1920, due to his resignation.

Later career
Following his resignation from the federal bench, Haight returned to private practice in Jersey City from 1920 to 1942.

Personal life and death
Haight was the nephew of General Charles Haight. He died on January 26, 1942.

References

Sources
 

1879 births
1942 deaths
People from Freehold Borough, New Jersey
Princeton University alumni
New Jersey lawyers
New York Law School alumni
Judges of the United States District Court for the District of New Jersey
United States district court judges appointed by Woodrow Wilson
Judges of the United States Court of Appeals for the Third Circuit
United States court of appeals judges appointed by Woodrow Wilson
20th-century American judges